The 2011–12 season was the Wellington Phoenix's fifth season in the A-League. After placing 4th at the conclusion of the regular season, the Phoenix's title hopes came to an end in the second round of the finals series, losing 3–2 to Perth in extra time.

Players

First team squad

As of 13 January 2012.

Contract extensions

Transfers

In

 Brackets round club names indicate the player's contract with that club had expired before he joined Wellington Phoenix.

Out

 Brackets round a club denote the player joined that club after his Phoenix contract expired.

Loans out

Matches

2011–12 Pre-season friendlies

2011–12 A-League fixtures

2011–12 Finals Series

Results by round

Statistics

Appearances

Goal scorers

Goal assists

Discipline

*Nick Ward was originally shown a yellow card, followed by a straight red card, however this decision was appealed, and the red card was subsequently rescinded.

Goal times

Home attendance

Club

Technical staff
First team Coach:  Ricki Herbert
Forwards Coach:  Chris Greenacre
Strength & Conditioning Coach: Lee Taylor

Kit
On 29 January 2012, The Wellington Phoenix wore a special black strip in their match against Melbourne Heart. The strip was designed by Andrew Durante, Tim Brown and Leo Bertos to raise money for charity with 100% of the TradeMe auction proceeds going to Cure Kids.

End of season Awards

Sony Player of the Year: Ben Sigmund
Members’ Player of the Year: Ben Sigmund
Players’ Player of the Year: Ben Sigmund
Media Player of the Year: Ben Sigmund
Golden Boot: Paul Ifill – 7 goals

References

External links

2011-12
2011–12 in New Zealand association football
2011–12 A-League season by team